Crepidonellus is a genus of beetles in the family Carabidae, containing the following 5 species:

 Crepidonellus endroedyi Basilewsky, 1975
 Crepidonellus latipalpis Basilewsky, 1988
 Crepidonellus migromaculatus Basilewsky, 1959
 Crepidonellus pusillus (Peringuey, 1888)
 Crepidonellus youngai Basilewsky, 1988

References

Brachininae